Remi Di Girolamo (born 26 April 1982 in Argenteuil, Val-d'Oise) is a French rower.

References 
 

1982 births
Living people
Sportspeople from Argenteuil
French male rowers
World Rowing Championships medalists for France